The Checkers were an American doo-wop group formed in 1952.  Bill Brown formed the Checkers after leaving the Dominoes. The Members were John Carnegie (Lead 1), Charlie White (lead 2) from The Clovers, James Turner "Buddy" Brewer (Baritone), Irwin "Teddy" Williams (Tenor), and Bill Brown (Bass).   The Checkers  [2].  The group was active from 1952 to 1955 when they would break up, only recording records on King Records and their subsidiary Federal Records. The most notable aspect of the group was their constantly changing sound. King kept on releasing bands under the pseudonym of "The Checkers" until the mid 70s.

Career

The group formed on 119th Street in Harlem in February 1952. Then it was just John and Irwin and other unknown members. Their name was chosen because they were fans of the Dominoes. James would soon join as well. Other members of the group at times were Eddie Harris, Perry Heyward, and "Little" David Baughan. After changing their roster quite often and performing on street corners, parties, and teen hops, they would meet up with Bill and Charlie. After that they starting to be recognized and stopped changing their roster. Two press photos were even taken. John never being in them because his father didn't want him in the group. 

By the time June came, they were ready to cut their first records. They were signed with King and recorded their first records on June 4th. John would be singing in the background of them. Recording 4 sides. But apart from those few records, John would not really be part of the group because of his father not wanting him in the group and wanting him to be in school. From there on out, the group was using the name "The Checkers" to compete with the Dominoes. 

Sometime In 1953, "Little" David Baughan would replace Perry Heyward as lead singer.

They would still record and perform throughout the rest of the years until they would break up in 1955. Their last record being released post-break up in December 1955. Recording a total of 12 songs all for King and re-released on Federal.

Deaths 
The book "Encyclopedia of Rhythm and Blues and Doo-Wop Vocal Groups" By Mitch Rosalsky, says that Bill brown died In 1956 and Another Source says Bill Brown died In 1958.(Also according to R&B historian Marv Goldberg, Bill Brown died before the mid-70s)

David Baughan Died In January of 1970.

Charlie White Died In 2005.

Perry Heyward Died On July 3rd, 2010.

John Carnegie, James Brewer, and Irwin Williams are also deceased.

References

External links
  Marv Goldberg's article on the Checkers
 Doo-Wop Blog article on the Checkers

American musical groups
Musical groups established in 1952 
Doo-wop groups
1952 establishments in New York City
Musical groups from Harlem